Noblesville Schools is a school district in Noblesville, Indiana, United States.

Its boundary includes much of Noblesville.

Schools

The district operates the following schools:

Elementary
 Hazel Dell Elementary
 Hinkle Creek Elementary
 Noble Crossing Elementary
 North Elementary
 Promise Road Elementary
 Stony Creek Elementary
 White River Elementary

Middle school
 Noblesville East Middle School
 Noblesville West Middle School

High school
 Noblesville High School

See also
 List of school districts in Indiana

References

External links

Noblesville, Indiana
School districts in Indiana